The 1919–20 season was Port Vale's first season of football back in the English Football League (their 14th overall following their brief 1892–96 and 1898–1907 spells in the league). It was their first Football League season at The Old Recreation Ground, and their first season in which they were in the same division as rivals Stoke. The club were also referred to as "the Valiants" for the first time, a nickname coined by chairman Frank Huntbach.

Their return to the Football League completed the success story of a local church team that rose to become a competitor in the second tier of English football. The club considers itself a continuation of the Burslem Port Vale that resigned from the league in 1907, and is recognized as such in an official capacity. The club rose from the North Staffordshire Federation League in 1907–08 to The Central League in 1911–12, and in October 1919 replaced Leeds City in the Football League Second Division.

Vale finished in mid-table, this was due in part to a tremendous season for top scorer Bobby Blood. As well as earning a return to the Football League, the club also enjoyed minor cup success, lifting the Staffordshire Senior Cup and sharing the North Staffordshire Infirmary Cup. In March 1920, Joe Schofield was appointed manager-secretary, a position he would retain throughout the decade.

[[File:Frank Huntbach.JPG|200px|thumb|right|Chairman Frank Huntbach, who coined the Valiants''' nickname.]]

Return to the Football League
Following Port Vale's resignation from the English Football League in 1907, and Stoke's resignation the years after, Staffordshire had been without representation in the league for eleven years. Following the end of the Great War, the Football League was organized back into its national form. In March 1919, Stoke, West Ham United, South Shields, Rotherham County, and Coventry City all gained re-election to the league – Port Vale were short by just one vote.

In the Central League, Vale had won five of their eight games against the reserve sides of Football League First Division clubs Aston Villa, Manchester United, Manchester City, Everton, Blackburn Rovers, and the reserve side of Second Division Huddersfield Town.

On 13 October 1919, Leeds City were expelled from the Football League over illegal payments to their players. Port Vale were elected to fill their spot (ahead of a bid from Tranmere Rovers). The club who had competed their 1906–07 season in the North Staffordshire Church League had taken the Port Vale name and played their way to the second tier of the national league within twelve years.

Port Vale's reserve side fulfilled the remaining fixtures in the Central League. Leeds City had already played their games against Blackpool, Coventry City, Hull City, and Wolverhampton Wanderers; leaving Vale with a solid starting point of ten points from eight matches.

Overview
The club built a strong side for the 1919–20 Central League campaign, signing skilful forward William Aitken and former Scotland international Peter Pursell from Rangers.

Second Division
Back in the Second Division, the club faced a battle to register their players in time for the nine-hour trip to South Shields, where they lost 2–0. Two defeats to eventual champions Tottenham Hotspur followed, before the club scored their first goal, and picked up their first win against South Shields on 10 November thanks to an Aaron Lockett strike. The club signed Bobby Blood from Leek United for £50 in order to bolster their strike force, the player had one leg shorter than the other and was riddled with bullets from his valiant efforts in the First World War, and yet he would still prove the doctors wrong who said he would never play football again. The win against South Shields initiated a run of three wins in five games. However this was followed by a streak of seven games without victory. Vale had settled in the league by January, and went into the derby with Stoke in March having lost just one of their previous eight games. This included a 4–0 win over Rotherham County which saw Blood score all four, and a 4–1 win over Nottingham Forest in which Blood claimed a hat-trick. Stoke dispatched the Vale 3–0 in front of the biggest home crowd of the season, the first ever encounter between the two clubs in the Football League. Seven days later, Vale went to Stoke to claim a point in front of 27,000 fans.

At the end of the season Vale finished with forty points, thirty of which came from their own efforts, and ten from Leeds City. This put them eleven points clear of the re-election zones, and fourteen points shy of promotion.

Easily the club's top scorer was Bobby Blood with 26 goals, 24 of which were in the league (Second Division). Blood was playing in the Football League for the first time at the age of 25. Billy Briscoe scored eight goals in seven Central League games, but failed to transfer this success to the Football League. Peter Pursell played 49 of 51 games, with fellow Scotsman William Aitken also rarely missing game. Tom Lyons and Alfred Bourne missed just four Second Division games between them. Tom Holford was another crucial player, who also acted as manager for much of the season. In March 1920, Joe Schofield was appointed manager-secretary.

Finances
Financially, the club were on much better terms than twelve years ago, with even practice matches well attended, and supporters groups busy raising cash to improve The Old Recreation Ground. Seats were priced between one and two shillings. The club had also made almost £700 on their 1918–19 Central League season. In 1919–20, they recorded a profit of almost £650.

Cup competitions
The club qualified for the FA Cup by easily dispatching Central Alliance side Loughborough Corinthians 4–0. In the First Round the Vale put up a brave fight against Manchester United, going out 1–0 in front of almost 15,000 supporters – thanks in part due to a great performance from opposition keeper Jack Mew. This was particularly remarkable considering that in their Central League game just four months earlier the Vale first team had lost 3–2 to the United Reserve outfit.

The club lifted the Staffordshire Senior Cup for the first time in their history, dispatching Stoke Reserves 1–0 in the First Round, before an epic semi-final with West Bromwich Albion Reserves that was settled after three replays with a Bobby Blood penalty. Billy Fitchford scored the only goal in the final against Birmingham Reserves at the Victoria Ground.

The annual North Staffordshire Infirmary Cup game finished goalless, and so the trophy was shared with Stoke. The match raised £309 for the local hospital.

League table

ResultsPort Vale's score comes first''

Legend

Central League

Football League Second Division

FA Cup

Staffordshire Senior Cup

North Staffordshire Infirmary Cup

Player statistics

Appearances

Top scorers

Transfers

Transfers in

Transfers out

References
Specific

General

Port Vale F.C. seasons
Port Vale